Art and Life in America is a book by  Oliver W. Larkin published in 1949 by Rinehart & Company  which won the 1950 Pulitzer Prize for History. It is a book which comprehensively deals about Art and artists in the United States .

References 

1949 non-fiction books
Pulitzer Prize for History-winning works